Louis Gidrol was a Chadian musician. He wrote the national anthem for Chad with Paul Villard in 1960, along with help from his student group. He and his students were part of St. Paul's School, which is where it was composed. It is called "La Tchadienne" and is played widely on important national events like Independence Day and to this day is one of the most important songs in Chad's history  because it was named the national anthem. Gidrol was born in 1922 and has died, however when he died is still unknown.

Here is a copy of the anthem written by Louis Gidrol.

References
 Hang, Xing (ed.). Encyclopedia of National Anthems. Scarerow Press, 2003, s.v. Chad, p. 123

1922 births
Year of death unknown
Chadian musicians
National anthem writers